Güneşli, historically Habsino, is a village in the Kilis District, Kilis Province, Turkey. The village had a population of 177 in 2022.

In late 19th century, German orientalist Martin Hartmann listed the village as a settlement of 5 houses inhabited by Kurds.

References

Villages in Kilis District
Kurdish settlements in Kilis Province